Joseph Sanders Pearson (born 1975 in Edmonton, Alberta) is a Canadian essayist, cultural historian, and journalist.

Life
Between 1997 and 2001, Pearson received his doctorate in Modern History at the University of Cambridge.
 Pearson has taught in the humanities at Columbia University, New York University, the Berlin University of the Arts, and the Barenboim–Said Academy, a peace project headed by conductor Daniel Barenboim. He is the nephew of children's novelist Kit Pearson.

Career
His history and portrait of the German capital, Berlin, was published by Reaktion Press and University of Chicago Press in 2017. The Independent called Berlin "the last word in explaining not only Berlin’s incredible history, but also its present day cultural situation" and Bloomberg reported that the book "masterfully offers a close reading of the metropolis in all its brutal immediacy". The book was also positively reviewed in The German Studies Review.

Pearson's new book My Grandfather's Knife was published by HarperCollins and The History Press in April 2022, with a Spanish translation by Planeta in October 2022. The book tells the stories of Second World War witnesses through everyday objects they owned. 

His work has appeared in Newsweek, The New England Review, the BBC, AGNI, Monocle Magazine, Prism International and many other publications. His non-fiction has been translated into German, French, Arabic, Mandarin and other languages.

Pearson is based in Berlin, Germany, where he is the in-house essayist of the Schaubühne Theatre and the editor of The Needle, one of Berlin's most popular blogs. He is a founding member of the artist collective, 'AGOSTO'.

Awards
In 2020, he was awarded a Jacob Zilber Prize for Short Fiction (First Runner-up), for his story "An Iconostasis". The story was nominated in 2020 for the Pushcart Prize.

References

External links
Official website

1975 births
Alumni of the University of Cambridge
Journalists from Alberta
Living people
Canadian male journalists
Canadian male essayists
21st-century Canadian journalists
Canadian expatriate writers
Canadian expatriates in Germany
Cultural historians
Canadian bloggers
Historians of Germany
Male bloggers
21st-century Canadian essayists
21st-century Canadian historians
21st-century Canadian male writers